Bengt Asbjörn "BP" Persson (31 October 1939 – 14 November 2013) was a Swedish runner. He competed in the steeplechase at the 1966 European Athletics Championships, 1968 Summer Olympics, and 1969 European Athletics Championships and placed 9th, 10th and 11th, respectively. Persson won the steeplechase at the Nordic Championships in 1963 and 1965. He was the Swedish champion in the steeplechase (1963–69), 5000 m (1965), 10,000 m (1965), 12 km cross country (1964–66), and 4 × 1500 m relay (1965–67).

References

1939 births
2013 deaths
Swedish male steeplechase runners
Olympic athletes of Sweden
Athletes (track and field) at the 1968 Summer Olympics
Sportspeople from Västerbotten County